Bucephalandra forcipula is a species of flowering plant in the family Araceae, native to Kalimantan on Borneo. It is an obligate rheophyte, found on granite waterfalls.

References

Aroideae
Endemic flora of Borneo
Plants described in 2014